Rhyd-uchaf is a hamlet in Gwynedd, Wales, approximately  northwest of Bala and  south of Frongoch (by footpath), on an unnamed road which provides access to Arenig Fawr. The community population taken at the 2011 census was 78.

Talybont Chapel
Talybont Chapel was built in 1837, with services held on behalf of the Presbyterian Church of Wales.

Governance
Rhyd-uchaf is within the electoral ward of Llandderfel and the parish of Llanycil.

References

Gwynedd